George Barnard Townsend (17 July 1814 – 19 August 1870) was an English first-class cricketer.

Townsend represented Hampshire in four first-class matches, making his debut in 1843 against the Marylebone Cricket Club and playing his final first-class match for the county in 1850 against an All-England Eleven.

Townsend died on 19 August 1870 at Christchurch, Hampshire.

External links 
 
 George Townsend at CricketArchive

English cricketers
Hampshire cricketers
Cricketers from Greater London
1814 births
1870 deaths